Metropolitan Magistrate Court is special type of magistrate court which is only found in metropolitan areas of Bangladesh. The 1976 instruct the government of Bangladesh to establish separate type of courts only for the metropolitan area. 

Metropolitan Magistrate Court is the second tier of court which is presided by Judicial Magistrates. These courts are subordinate to and under the control of Metropolitan Session Courts.

Classification

Metropolitan Magistrate Court has a three tier structure, those are

Chief Metropolitan Magistrate Court
Additional Chief Metropolitan Magistrate Court
Metropolitan Magistrate Court (1st Class)

Additional Chief Metropolitan Magistrates have all or any of the powers of the Chief Metropolitan Magistrate. Metropolitan Magistrate, also known as 1st class Metropolitan Magistrates are subordinate to the Chief Metropolitan Magistrate.

Scope of penalty

The powers of the Metropolitan Magistrate include imprisonment for a maximum of five years, a solitary confinement is authorized by law, fine not exceeding taka 10,000 and the order of whipping.

References

Judiciary of Bangladesh
Law of Bangladesh
Politics of Bangladesh